Mike Bryan and Lisa Raymond were the defending champions, but Bryan decided not to compete to focus on winning the Men's doubles with his brother Bob. Raymond partnered with Bruno Soares.

Daniel Nestor and Kristina Mladenovic defeated Soares and Raymond in the final, 5–7, 6–2, 8–6 to win the mixed doubles tennis title at the 2013 Wimbledon Championships.

Seeds
All seeds received a bye into the second round. 

  Bruno Soares /  Lisa Raymond (final)
  Horia Tecău /  Sania Mirza (quarterfinals)
  Nenad Zimonjić /  Katarina Srebotnik (semifinals)
  Max Mirnyi /  Andrea Hlaváčková (second round)
  Alexander Peya /  Anna-Lena Grönefeld (third round)
  Marcelo Melo /  Liezel Huber (third round)
  Rohan Bopanna /  Zheng Jie (quarterfinals)
  Daniel Nestor /  Kristina Mladenovic (champions)
  Treat Huey /  Raquel Kops-Jones (second round)
  Aisam-ul-Haq Qureshi /  Cara Black (third round)
  Marcin Matkowski /  Květa Peschke (quarterfinals)
  František Čermák /  Lucie Hradecká (second round)
  Scott Lipsky /  Casey Dellacqua (third round)
  David Marrero /  Kimiko Date-Krumm (third round)
  Leander Paes /  Zheng Saisai (second round)
  Ivan Dodig /  Marina Erakovic (second round)

Draw

Finals

Top half

Section 1

Section 2

Bottom half

Section 3

Section 4

References

External links

2013 Wimbledon Championships on WTAtennis.com
2013 Wimbledon Championships – Doubles draws and results at the International Tennis Federation

X=Mixed Doubles
Wimbledon Championship by year – Mixed doubles